Aechmea ramosa is a plant species in the genus Aechmea. This species is endemic to eastern Brazil.

Two varieties are recognized:
Aechmea ramosa var. festiva L.B.Sm. - Espírito Santo
Aechmea ramosa var. ramosa  - Bahia
Many cultivars of A. ramosa have been recorded.

References

ramosa
Flora of Brazil
Plants described in 1830